The Hungary national football team has represented Hungary in international association football since 1902. Hungary played its first international match on 12 October 1902, losing to neighbouring Austria 5–0 in a friendly. The team is governed by the Hungarian Football Federation (MLSZ) and competes as a member of the Union of European Football Associations (UEFA), which encompasses the countries of Europe and Israel. As of November 2022, Hungary has played a total of 976 international matches. Hungary have played Austria most frequently, meeting the side 137 times. Of these, Hungary have won 67, drawn 30 and lost 40. The Austria–Hungary football rivalry is the second-most played international fixture in football history, behind only the Argentina–Uruguay rivalry which has been played officially 194 times.

Balázs Dzsudzsák is Hungary's most capped player with 109 caps.

Players
Appearances and goals are composed of FIFA World Cup and UEFA European Championships, and each competition's required qualification matches, as well as UEFA Nations League matches and numerous international friendly tournaments and matches. Players are listed by number of caps. If the number of caps is equal, the players are then listed alphabetically. Statistics updated following match played on 20 November 2022.

Notes

References

Association football player non-biographical articles
Hungary
Hungary national football team
international footballers